My Destiny is the 15th international co-production of MediaCorp TV and ntv7. It is a remake of the 2004 MediaCorp drama The Ties That Bind (家财万贯).

Synopsis
The story begins with Li Ruo Nan's family shifting to a new house. Ruo Nan's father, played by Lee Boon Hai owns a furniture shop. The tomboy-ish Ruo Nan met with a guy(Kyo Chen). They were enemies at first but soon they became best friends. As time passes, Ruo Nan fell in love with him. But sadly he did not like Ruo Nan. This made Ruo Nan sad. She ignored him since. Then, he realised that he actually like her and he tried to woo her back. Ruo Nan was badly wounded at that time and she refused to accept him. Meanwhile, Ruo Nan's auntie (Ann Kok) is a lazy person. Usually, Ruo Nan's father, Yao Guang will clean up the mess for her. Yao Guang met a woman whom he sympathised with. Ruo Nan's mother became jealous. Yao Guang can not put up with her behaviour anymore and he moved out of that house. One day, Ruo Nan's mother went for a medical check-up and the doctor discovered a tumour in her breast. She refused an operation to remove the tumour, thus Ruo Nan's mother condition worsens. Yao Guang's heart soften and he managed to advise her to undergo the operation.

Cast
Hishiko Woo as Li Ruo Nan
Tiffany Leong as Du Li Hong
Johnson Lee as Wang Zhen Qiang
Kyo Chen 
Ann Kok as Wang Zhen Hui
Lee Boon Hai as Yao Guang

References

Chinese-language drama television series in Malaysia
Singapore Chinese dramas
Singapore–Malaysia television co-productions
2009 Malaysian television series debuts
2009 Malaysian television series endings
2009 Singaporean television series debuts
2009 Singaporean television series endings
NTV7 original programming
Channel 8 (Singapore) original programming